Cherry Creek Golf Links is a golf club located in Riverhead on Long Island in the state of New York in the United States. A second course, The Woods at Cherry Creek, was added across the street in 2002.

Geography
Cherry Creek Golf Links is a scenic links-style course with rolling fairways and elevated tees and greens situated in Riverhead out on the eastern end of Long Island. They raised their weekend golf special  fees with cart after 12 pm  to $60 from $50 in 2017.  
The course designed by Charles Jurgens can stretch to 7187 yards with a par of 73. The fairways are generous and long with water coming into play on four of the 18 holes.

The Signature Hole is the 12th, a 389-yard par 4 that plays from an elevated tee to a narrow, sloping fairway with a pond on the right. The Par 6 18th Hole, which is the only par 6 in the New York Metropolitan Area stretches 644 yards when played from the tips and ties for the longest hole in the Metropolitan Area.

References

External links
 Cherry Creek Golf Links
 The Woods at Cherry Creek
 Cherry Creek Golf Links at LongIslandGolfNews.com

Golf clubs and courses in New York (state)
Riverhead (town), New York
1996 establishments in New York (state)